Events from the year 1998 in Pakistan.

Incumbents

Federal government
President: Wasim Sajjad (acting) (until 1 January), Muhammad Rafiq Tarar (starting 1 January)
Prime Minister: Nawaz Sharif
Chief Justice: Ajmal Mian

Governors
Governor of Balochistan – Miangul Aurangzeb
Governor of Khyber Pakhtunkhwa – Arif Bangash
Governor of Punjab – Shahid Hamid 
Governor of Sindh – Moinuddin Haider

Events
The fifth census of Pakistan is compiled.
The Australian cricket team begin their first successful tour
 May 28 – The first nuclear test — Codename Chagai-I —  was conducted and supervised by the Pakistan Atomic Energy Commission (PAEC) on May 28, 1998 Ras Koh Chaghi, Baluchistan.
 May 30 – The second nuclear test — Codename Chagai-II — was conducted and supervised by the Pakistan Atomic Energy Commission (PAEC) on May 30, 1998.
 Japan and other nations to impose economic sanctions. 
 Pakistan celebrates Youm-e-Takbir annually.

Movie
 Choorian - one of the highest grossing film of all times in Pakistan was released.
 Pakistani films of 1998

Music
 Azadi album was released in India in February 1998 by EMI. 
 Dosti was released by Junoon in Pakistan.

Births
 10 August - Azam Khan, cricketer.
 23 October - Shadab Khan, cricketer.

Deaths

See also
1997 in Pakistan
Other events of 1998
1999 in Pakistan
Timeline of Pakistani history

References

 
1998 in Asia